4446 Carolyn, provisional designation , is a dark Hildian asteroid from the outermost regions of the asteroid belt, approximately  in diameter. It was discovered on 15 October 1985, by American astronomer Edward Bowell at the Anderson Mesa Station of the Lowell Observatory near Flagstaff, Arizona, in the United States. The asteroid was named after American astronomer Carolyn Shoemaker. It has a longer than average rotation period of 40.9 hours.

Orbit and classification 

Carolyn is a member of the dynamical Hilda group of asteroids. However, it is not a member of any asteroid family but an asteroid of the main-belt's background population when applying the hierarchical clustering method to its proper orbital elements. It orbits the Sun in the outermost asteroid belt at a distance of 2.9–5.1 AU once every 8 years (2,911 days; semi-major axis of 3.99 AU). Its orbit has an eccentricity of 0.28 and an inclination of 7° with respect to the ecliptic.

Physical characteristics 

Carolyn is an assumed carbonaceous C-type asteroid.

Rotation period 

In July 2016, a first rotational lightcurve of Carolyn was obtained from photometric observations by astronomers Brian Warner, Robert Stephens and Dan Coley at the Center for Solar System Studies in California. Lightcurve analysis gave a well-defined rotation period of 40.92 hours with a brightness amplitude of 0.22 magnitude. While not being a slow rotator, its period is significantly longer than the typical 2 to 20 hours measured for most asteroids.

Diameter and albedo 

According to the surveys carried out by the Japanese Akari satellite and the NEOWISE mission of NASA's Wide-field Infrared Survey Explorer, Carolyn measures 28.645 and 31.57 kilometers in diameter and its surface has an albedo of 0.086 and 0.075, respectively.

The Collaborative Asteroid Lightcurve Link assumes a standard albedo for carbonaceous asteroids of 0.057 and calculates a diameter of 32.03 kilometers based on an absolute magnitude of 11.2.

Naming 

This minor planet was named by the discoverer after American astronomer Carolyn Shoemaker (born 1929), a prolific discoverer of minor planets and comets, such as Comet Shoemaker–Levy 9. Many of her discoveries were co-discoveries with her husband Gene Shoemaker. The official naming citation was prepared by David Levy and Jean Mueller, and published by the Minor Planet Center on 27 June 1991.

Notes

References

External links 
 Asteroid Lightcurve Database (LCDB), query form (info )
 Dictionary of Minor Planet Names, Google books
 Asteroids and comets rotation curves, CdR – Observatoire de Genève, Raoul Behrend
 Discovery Circumstances: Numbered Minor Planets (1)-(5000) – Minor Planet Center
 
 

004446
Discoveries by Edward L. G. Bowell
Named minor planets
19851015